Riverside City College (RCC) is a public community college in Riverside, California. The college is part of the Riverside Community College District, as well as the larger California Community Colleges System.

History
RCC first opened in 1916 at the same site as the Riverside Polytechnic High School (Riverside Poly). Originally known as Riverside Junior College and later as Riverside City College, the school changed its name to Riverside Community College in the mid-1980s. In 2008, the board of trustees renamed the institution back to Riverside City College.

The junior college expanded from the Riverside Poly campus and in 1924 constructed the first two buildings of the campus quadrangle in 1924. When Riverside Poly re-located to its own campus on Victoria Avenue in 1965 the college assumed total control of the Magnolia property.

Today, Riverside City College is part of the greater Riverside Community College District which enrolls about 21,000 students each semester. Students may earn an associate degree, transfer to a four-year college or university, or earn a career certificate.

In addition to the campus located in downtown Riverside, there are campuses in Moreno Valley and Norco. Separate education centers include the Riverside County Sheriff's Department Ben Clark Public Safety Training Center, the Center for Teaching Excellence at Stokoe, and the Rubidoux Annex in Rubidoux. RCC is also home to Gateway to College, a charter school that serves those returning to high school seeking diplomas as adults.

RCC maintains programs in liberal arts and science, athletics, and performing arts and vocational education. The school band is the RCC Marching Tigers, which includes the Fantasia Winter Guard, which has won several Winter Guard International awards, a Fall Marching Band, a Winter Drum Line, and a Spring Pep Band. The student newspaper is Viewpoints. The college is home to the School for Nursing.

In 2016, RCC opened the Henry W. Coil Sr. and Alice Edna Coil School for the Arts on University Avenue and Market Street, adjacent to the historic White Park. The school is the home of the college's music program, including the internationally renowned RCC Chamber Singers, and the RCC Jazz Ensemble. The school combining classrooms, studios, and digital media labs, built around a state of the art concert hall designed with adjustable acoustics. The new school serves around 1,000 students preparing for careers in vocal or instrumental performance, music education, and careers in the music industry.

The college's marching band performed at the Tournament of Roses Parade in Pasadena, California on January 1, 2010, and at Bandfest at Pasadena City College.

Athletics
The Riverside City College Tigers compete in the Orange Empire Conference (OEC) and Southern California Football Association, which operates within the California Community College Athletic Association. The college currently fields nine men's teams and nine women's teams.

The athletic facilities include Fran Bushman Tennis Courts, Riverside Aquatics Complex, Samuel C. Evans Complex, Wheelock Gymnasium and Wheelock Stadium.

Notable alumni
 Jeff Bajenaru – Major League Baseball
 Chester Carlson – American physicist, inventor, and patent attorney
 Jesse Chavez – Major League Baseball
 John Gabbert – California Court of Appeal judge, Superior Court judge.
 Mike Garcia – Major League Baseball
 Tommy Hanson – Major League Baseball
 Jess Hill – Major League Baseball from 1935 to 1937, first person to both play for and coach Rose Bowl champions
 J. C. Jackson – NFL Cornerback
 Domaine Javier – Transgender actress, writer, reality TV personality, registered nurse, and activist
 Sharon Jordan – American film and television actress. Recurred on the Disney series The Suite Life of Zack & Cody.
 Bobby Kielty – Major League Baseball
 Noureddine Morceli – Olympic track champion
 Ryan Navarro – American football player
 Douglas Negrete – All-American Marathoner
 Paul Oglesby – American football player
 Miné Okubo – Artist and writer
 AJ Rafael – American singer-songwriter
 Kathy Raymond – Model
 Bob Rule – NBA All-Star center.
 Richard S. Prather – American mystery novelist, pseudonyms David Knight and Douglas Ring
 Will Smith – Dallas Cowboys linebacker
 Chris Stewart – Major League Baseball
 Jeff Soto – Professional Artist, painter
 Brian Stokes – Major League Baseball
 Susan Straight – Published writer and novelist, Professor at the University of California, Riverside
 Charles Tuaau – NFL Nose Tackle

Notable former faculty
 Kurt Barber – National Football League, Coach at RCC
 Bob Boyd (basketball) – William Robert "Bob" Boyd, Head coach at the University of Southern California (USC) and Mississippi State University, Head coach at RCC
 Edmund Jaeger – noted biologist (the Edmund C. Jaeger Desert Institute on the Moreno Valley College campus is named in his honor)
 Jess Mortensen – NCAA champion track athlete, USC track and field, Coach at RCC
 Jerry Tarkanian – NCAA Basketball coach, RCC coach
 Bob Schermerhorn – NCAA Basketball coach, RCC coach

References

External links 
 
 

California Community Colleges
Educational institutions established in 1916
Sports venues in Riverside, California
Education in Riverside, California
Universities and colleges in Riverside County, California
1916 establishments in California